Stephanie Bengson (born 31 January 1987) is a former professional Australian tennis player. Her career has developed more in doubles than singles. Her highest singles ranking is No. 541, achieved in October 2012. Her highest doubles ranking is No. 154, achieved in June 2012.

Career

2005-2008
Bengson played collegiate D1 tennis at Long Beach State. She was the Big West Conference Freshman of the Year in 2005 and first team All-Big West honoree three times. A member of four League Championship and NCAA post-season teams, Bengson earned a collegiate career-high No. 31 in doubles and No. 115 national ranking. She was a key part of the 2008 team that achieved Long Beach's highest ever team ranking at No. 18 in the ITA rankings.

2011
Bengson won three doubles titles on tournaments of the ITF Women's Circuit in 2011.

2012
Bengson started her year playing at the Premier-level tournament in Sydney. She and Tyra Calderwood fell in the first round to Maria Kirilenko and Nadia Petrova. She and Calderwood then received a wildcard into the Australian Open, but they also fell in the first round to Eva Birnerová and Alberta Brianti. This was Stephanie's first Grand Slam performance.

In May, Bengson went back to the ITF Circuit, competing in a string of Japanese Challengers. She won her biggest title yet at the $50k-level tournament in Fukuoka in May, winning the doubles event with fellow Australian, Monique Adamczak. She then went to compete in the WTA International event, a week before Roland Garros in Strasbourg. She played alongside Adamczak in the doubles event and reached her first ever WTA Tour quarterfinal. The pair defeated Slovak duo Lenka Juríková and Kristína Kučová in the first round, and fell in the quarterfinals to Alexandra Cadanțu and Anne Keothavong.

Before the tour
Bengson played from 2005 to 2008 at nationally ranked Long Beach State. She was twice named first team all conference in both singles and doubles while earning career-high national rankings of No. 31 in doubles and 115 in singles during her senior season. Her team won the Big West Conference title and advanced to the NCAA's all four seasons she played at Long Beach State, including a No. 18 team-ranking during 2006. She graduated in 2008.

ITF Circuit finals

Doubles: 11 (4–7)

References

External links
 
 

Living people
1987 births
Australian female tennis players
Sportspeople from Wollongong
California State University, Long Beach alumni
Tennis people from New South Wales